Hermenegildo Leite (born May 17, 2000 in Luanda) is an Angolan sprinter. He competed at the 2016 Summer Olympics in the men's 100 metres race, being 16 years old and the youngest competitor in the angolian team. His time of 11.65 seconds in the preliminary round did not qualify him for the first round.

International competitions

References

External links
 

2000 births
Living people
Angolan male sprinters
Olympic athletes of Angola
Athletes (track and field) at the 2016 Summer Olympics